The Victor or The Victors may refer to:

Comics, film and TV
The Victors (1918 film), German silent drama, original title Die Sieger
The Victor (1923 film), American silent comedy film directed by Edward Laemmle
The Victor (1932 film), German musical comedy, original title Der Sieger
The Victor (comics), British weekly comic magazine published from 1961 to 1992
The Victors (1963 film), British-American all-star World War II drama by Carl Foreman
"The Victor", March 8, 1989 episode on List of Dragon Ball episodes

Constructions
The Victor, 1909 American condominiums in New Jersey for RCA Victor (Nipper Building)
The Victor, 1928 Serbian monument in Belgrade, original name Pobednik

Songs
"The Victors", 1898 American fight song at University of Michigan
"The Victor", 1975 American Christian song by Jamie Owens-Collins

See also

Victor (disambiguation)
The Victoria (disambiguation)